The piping peeping frog (Eleutherodactylus syristes) is a species of frog in the family Eleutherodactylidae.
It is endemic to Mexico.
Its natural habitat is subtropical or tropical moist lowland forests.
It is threatened by habitat loss.

References

Eleutherodactylus
Amphibians described in 1965
Taxonomy articles created by Polbot